Bandera - from a Spanish word meaning a flag - may refer to:

Places
 Bandera County, Texas, U.S.
 Bandera, Texas, its county seat
 Bandera High School
 Bandera Creek, a river, with its source near Bandera Pass
 Bandera Pass, a mountain pass
 Bandera Mountain, Washington, U.S.
 Bandera, Santiago del Estero, Argentina, a municipality and village
 Bandera State Airport in King County, Washington, U.S.

People
 Alcides Bandera (born 1978), Uruguayan footballer
 Andriy Bandera (1882–1941), chaplain and politician
 Manuel Bandera (born 1960), Spanish actor
 Quintín Bandera (–1906), military leader
 Stepan Bandera (1909–1959), Ukrainian far-right leader
 Vaitiare Bandera (born 1964), American actress

Other uses
 Bandera (moth), a genus of moth
 Inquirer Bandera, a tabloid newspaper based in the Philippines
 Bandera, a military unit of the Spanish Legion of the Spanish Army
 USS Bandera, U.S. navy ship

See also
 Bandera Roja (disambiguation)
 La Bandera (disambiguation)
 Banderas (disambiguation)
 
 Bandeira (disambiguation)
 Bandiera, an Italian surname